Krishna (Kristo) Jiban Sanyal  (1893 - 1925) participated in the Indian Independence Movement. He was an Indian revolutionary and member of the Jugantar group who carried out assassinations against British colonial officials in an attempt to secure Indian independence.

Life 
Krishna (Kristo) Jiban Sanyal was born in Malda. He developed a patriotic spirit from his childhood. He started his education at Malda Zilla School, later he came to Calcutta for higher studies where he was influenced by Nationality spirits and joined Jugantar at an early age. After the Manicktolla bomb conspiracy, a search was occurred at Manicktollah Garden, among the 1500 documents and material evidence found there, were some school books, which belonged to Krishna Jiban. At that time Krishna Jiban was hiding at  Malda in his native place. Because of this evidence (his school books) Krishna Jiban was arrested by the police from his hideout on 12 May 1908 at Kanshat, Malda. In Krishna Jiban's house at Malda  were found thirty-nine copies of the Yugantar of various dates, some of the copies dating back to 1906 which proves his direct connection with Jugantar. Later he made statement to the Police that “Barin Ghose used to read Gita to me and Upen Banerjee used to read Upanishads to me. Barin also used to read about Russo-Japanese war. Ullaskar Dutt delivered lectures regarding explosives on 2 occasions”. In May 1909  Krishna Jiban Sanyal was convicted under Section 121A of the Indian Penal Code found guilty and sentenced to one year's rigorous imprisonment.

Death 
He died in 1925.

Further reading
Bandyopadhyay, Upendranath (1921). নির্বাসিতের আত্মকথা, Calcutta: Hrishikesh Kanjilal.
Ghosh, Barindra Kumar (1922). The Tale of My Exile, Pondicherry: Arya Office.
Ghosh, Barindra Kumar (1922). বারীন্দ্রের আত্মকাহিনী, Calcutta: D.M. Library.
Datta, Ullaskar (1923). কারাজীবনী, Calcutta: Arya Publishing House.
Datta, Ullaskar (1924). Twelve Years of Prison Life, Pondicherry: Arya Office.

References

1893 births
1925 deaths
Anushilan Samiti
Prisoners and detainees of British India
Indian revolutionaries
Revolutionary movement for Indian independence
Revolutionaries from West Bengal